Nenets may refer to:
Nenets Autonomous Okrug, a federal subject of Russia
Yamalo-Nenets Autonomous Okrug, a federal subject of Russia
Nenets people, a Samoyedic people
Nenets languages, a small language family of two closely related Samoyedic languages spoken by the Nenets people:
Tundra Nenets language
Forest Nenets language

Language and nationality disambiguation pages